Angove Lake is a permanent fresh water lake in the Great Southern region of Western Australia, within the Two Peoples Bay Nature Reserve.

Description
The lake is part of the Moates Lake System, along with Moates Lake and Lake Gardner. All of these lakes were linked to form a large estuarine system during the last interglacial period approximately 120,000 years ago.

The area south of the lake was drained with a  channel being constructed to connect it with Gardner Creek. The water in the lake is fresh and low in tannin, water from the river system that supplies the lake is also used pumped to Albany as part of the town's water supply.

Environment
The lake lies within the Two Peoples Bay Nature Reserve. Very little of the catchment is cleared so the stream system and the lake are in almost pristine condition. The lake itself is essentially a large sedge swamp with large stands of Baumea articulata with a fringing forest of paperbark and Agonis.  The lake forms part of the Two Peoples Bay and Mount Manypeaks Important Bird Area, identified as such by BirdLife International because of its significance in the conservation of several rare and threatened bird species.

The critically endangered Spotted galaxias (Galaxias truttaceus hesperius) is only found in the Angove River, the lake and the Goodga River.

See also

 List of lakes of Western Australia

References 

Angove
Important Bird Areas of Western Australia